The 1998 BMW Open was an Association of Tennis Professionals men's tennis tournament held in Munich, Germany. The tournament was held from 27 April to 4 May 1998. Seventh-seeded Thomas Enqvist won the singles title.

Finals

Singles

 Thomas Enqvist defeated  Andre Agassi 6–7(4–7), 7–6(8–6), 6–3
 It was Enqvist's 2nd title of the year and the 14th of his career.

Doubles

 Todd Woodbridge /  Mark Woodforde defeated  Joshua Eagle /  Andrew Florent 6–0, 6–3
 It was Woodbridge's 4th title of the year and the 57th of his career. It was Woodforde's 4th title of the year and the 60th of his career.

References

External links 
Association of Tennis Professionals (ATP) – tournament profile

 
BMW Open
Bavarian International Tennis Championships
BMW Open
BMW Open